Darfield F.C. was an English association football club based in Darfield, South Yorkshire.

History
The club was formed as Darfield St. George's, and competed in the FA Cup under that name in 1919. The following summer they changed their name to Houghton Main Colliery and reached the 3rd Qualifying Round of the cup before winning the  Yorkshire League in their debut campaign in the competition.

In 1923 they left the Yorkshire League and joined the Barnsley Association League, being renamed simply Darfield in the process. Darfield won the Sheffield Senior Cup in 1927, beating Ecclesfield United in the final at Birdwell. A year later they finished top of the Barnsley league, but the club was wound up in 1932.

A new club using Darfield's old name, Houghton Main, was founded after the Second World War and currently (2016) competes in the Sheffield & Hallamshire County Senior League.

Records
Best FA Cup performance: 3rd Qualifying Round, 1920–21

References

Defunct football clubs in England
Defunct football clubs in South Yorkshire
Yorkshire Football League
Barnsley Association League
Mining association football teams in England